Liz Gallardo (born November 28, 1979) is a Mexican television actress, became known for her role as Tania in the film El búfalo de la noche.

Filmography

Film

Television

References

External links
 

1979 births
Living people
21st-century Mexican actresses
Mexican emigrants to the United States
Mexican film actresses
Mexican telenovela actresses
Mexican television actresses